Abraham Creighton may refer to:
 Abraham Creighton (died 1706), MP for Fermanagh and Enniskillen
 Abraham Creighton, 1st Baron Erne (1703–1772)
 Abraham Creighton (died 1809), MP for Lifford
 Abraham Creighton, 2nd Earl Erne (1765–1842)